Dypsis ceracea is a species of flowering plant in the family Arecaceae. It is found only in Madagascar. It is threatened by habitat loss.

References

ceracea
Endemic flora of Madagascar
Critically endangered plants
Taxonomy articles created by Polbot
Taxa named by Henri Lucien Jumelle